Sabino Islas Jiménez (December 30, 1917 – November 4, 1998) was a Mexican boxer who competed in the 1936 Summer Olympics.

In 1936 he was eliminated in the first round of the featherweight class after losing his fight to Jan Nicolaas of the Netherlands. He died in Mexico City.

External links
Sabino Islas' profile at Sports Reference.com

1917 births
1998 deaths
Boxers from Mexico City
Featherweight boxers
Olympic boxers of Mexico
Boxers at the 1936 Summer Olympics
Mexican male boxers